Matthew Mishory is an American film director of Israeli descent. He has directed both narrative and documentary films and was named a "rising talent" by Variety Magazine in 2013. His award-winning 2009 film, Delphinium, about Derek Jarman, was preserved by the British Film Institute in its National Film Archive.

Life and career 
Mishory was born on July 17, 1982 in Santa Monica, California, and grew up in Los Angeles, California. He is a citizen of the United States and Israel. He studied film at the University of California, Santa Barbara.

Mishory's 2009 short film, Delphinium, about the legendary English artist Derek Jarman, was screened at dozens of film festivals before being permanently installed in the British Film Institute's National Film Archive. The film was subsequently re-released in the UK by the BFI as part of the year-long Jarman 2014 celebration. In 2017, it was presented by the Tate Britain Museum in London.

His feature film debut, the 35 mm black-and-white Joshua Tree, 1951: A Portrait of James Dean, debuted at the Transilvania International Film Festival on June 10, 2012, and was released theatrically in the United States, the UK, and Germany, and received a Jury Prize at the 2012 Image+Nation Montreal Film Festival. Writing for Film International, Robert Kenneth Dator wrote, "Matthew Mishory has managed to capture an austere beauty of a kind little known by all but the likes of Baudelaire.”

Mishory's second feature film, the documentary Absent, was filmed in remote rural Moldova. It concerns the village of Mărculeşti, site of a horrible atrocity in 1941 in which all of the village's Jews were massacred by the Romanian army.

The film introduces the current residents of Mărculeşti, who seem to be unaware (or unwilling to discuss) what happened. Mishory's own grandparents lived in the village, escaping to Israel just before the start of the Holocaust.

In an interview with the online magazine Tablet, Mishory discussed the complex emotions of filming there: "The history of Mărculeşti and the Holocaust pose impossible intellectual and theological questions. All I can say is that my feelings about what happened in Mărculeşti are complicated. I remain a practicing Jew. And I also have serious doubts about human nature. I’m angry that people who live overlooking a killing field lie about their history. But I also have a lot of empathy for the current residents of the village and their difficult circumstances.”

Mishory's third feature, Artur Schnabel: No Place of Exile, was made for the German-French television network Arte. The film was shot in Switzerland, Italy, Vienna, and Berlin, utilizing unexpected textures (such as Super 8, drone footage, and back-projection) and the German actor Udo Samel to chart pianist/composer Artur Schnabel's course through the emotional and physical landscapes of the European 20th century. In November 2018, the film was screened at The Library of Congress in Washington D.C. In 2019 it was released on the classical music channel medici.tv.

In March 2018, Mishory began filming Mosolov's Suitcase, the story of the Russian avant-garde composer Alexander Mosolov, sent to the gulag by Joseph Stalin, with César Award-nominated actor Kirill Emelyanov in the title role. The same year, he began development on Goldberg Variations, a feature film co-written by Israeli screenwriter Golan Friedman and expected to be filmed in Israel. In 2020, a teaser was released for Mosolov's Suitcase, with further filming planned in Moscow and Palm Springs. In 2021, it was announced in Variety Magazine that Mishory would be directing the documentary Who Are the Marcuses? for Stone Canyon Entertainment and Rhino Films.

Mishory also directs commercials. In 2018, he directed the "Powerful Performance” campaign for the brand TCL, starring NBA All-Star Giannis Antetokounmpo. In 2020, he again directed Antetokounmpo, along with his brother, Thanasis, in the "Enjoy More" campaign. He also directed a surf campaign with pro surfer Tia Blanco, filmed in Los Cabos, Mexico.

Filmography 
 Delphinium: A Childhood Portrait of Derek Jarman (2009)
 Joshua Tree, 1951: A Portrait of James Dean (2012)
 Absent (2015)
 Artur Schnabel: No Place of Exile (2018)'''
Who Are the Marcuses? (2022)

References

External links 
 

1982 births
American documentary film directors
20th-century American Jews
American people of Israeli descent
Living people
People from Santa Monica, California
University of California, Santa Barbara alumni
21st-century American Jews